Crossroads, Kentucky, may refer to historic names for:

 Florence, Kentucky
 Sacramento, Kentucky